Sparta Asia Football Club is a Hong Kong football club currently competing in the Hong Kong Second Division.

During the 2008–09 season, it once competed in the top-tier Hong Kong First Division, and was relegated after finishing 12th out of 13 teams.

At the end of the 2010–11 season, after gaining promotion to the First Division from the runner-up position in the Second Division, it withdrew from the First Division and was expunged from the Hong Kong league system by the HKFA. IT rejoined the league system and competed in the Fourth Division in the 2012–13 season.

In 2015, the Asia football academy of the Dutch Eredivisie club Sparta Rotterdam took charge of the club and it rebranded as Sparta Rotterdam Mutual FC. The partnership ended after 2018. It was revived in 2019 when the club was rebranded as Sparta Asia.

Honours

League
Hong Kong Second Division
Champions (2): 2007–08, 2016–17
Runners-up (1): 2010–11
Hong Kong Third Division
Champions (1):  1996–97
Hong Kong Fourth Division
Runners-up (1): 2012–13

Cup Competitions
Hong Kong Junior Shield
Champions (1):  2000–01

Recent seasons

External links
 Sparta Asia Football Club at HKFA

Hong Kong Second Division League
Football clubs in Hong Kong
1993 establishments in Hong Kong
Sparta Rotterdam
Association football clubs established in 1993